Jackson Lake State Park is a public recreation area covering  along the shores of  Jackson Lake in Jackson County, Ohio, in the United States. Recreational activities available at the park include camping, boating, fishing, swimming and picnicking.

History
The forests in and around Jackson Lake State Park were previously harvested to fire the furnaces of numerous 19th-century iron works that were located in southern Ohio. Remnants of the Jefferson Iron Furnace are found in the park.

The park was established as a state park in 1979. It had previously been a "state reserve", similar to a park but with less development, after a dam was built on Black Fork creating Jackson Lake in 1938. The reserve was home to a small camping area with a beach on the lake. Jackson Lake State Park was established after the facilities were expanded and improved.

Ecology
Jackson Lake State Park is in the Appalachian Highlands region of Ohio. The hilly sandstone region is home to diverse plant and animal populations. The region contains nearly 70% of the woodlands in Ohio. At one time this same region was a barren wasteland that had been stripped of its old growth forests to provide fuel for the iron furnaces. The forests have since regrown with a diversity of hardwoods including hickory, oak, and maple.

A variety of animals are found in Jackson Lake State Park. These animals are protected from hunting in the park. They include most common eastern woodland creatures such as the white-tailed deer, skunks, wild turkeys, opossums, raccoons, eastern gray squirrels, great horned owls and numerous songbirds, reptiles and amphibians. Plant life at the park includes dame's violet, goldenrod, spring beauties and asters.

Recreation
The park offers camping, picnicking, swimming, boating, and fishing. Common game fish in Jackson Lake include carp, bass, bluegill and muskellunge.

References

External links

Jackson Lake State Park Ohio Department of Natural Resources
Jackson Lake State Park Map Ohio Department of Natural Resources

State parks of Ohio
Protected areas of Jackson County, Ohio
Protected areas established in 1979
1979 establishments in Ohio